General elections were held in Bolivia on 17 June 1956. Hernán Siles Zuazo of the Revolutionary Nationalist Movement (MNR) was elected President with 84% of the vote, whilst the MNR won 61 of the 68 seats in the Chamber of Deputies and all 18 seats in the Senate.

Results

References

Elections in Bolivia
Bolivia
1956 in Bolivia
Presidential elections in Bolivia